Bhakta Potana is a 1943 Telugu-language biographical film directed by K. V. Reddy in his directorial debut. Based on the life of poet-saint Potana who translated Bhagavatham into Telugu language, the film was scripted by Samudrala Sr. The film had celebrated Jubilee runs all over the South India including Mysore state and Kerala. It was remade in 1966, starring Gummadi as Potana.

Plot 
Bammera Potana is a staunch devotee of Lord Rama. He lived a pious life with his wife Narasamamba, son Mallanna and daughter Lakshmi in Ekasilapuram. Lord Rama appears before him and orders him to translate Bhagavatam into Telugu language. Sarada daughter of his brother-in-law Srinatha lived with his family after death of her mother. King Sarvagna Singabhoopala sends Srinatha to convince Potana to dedicate the Bhagavatam to him. Potana refused the request and dedicated his work to Lord Rama. The King's attempt to forcibly take it and exile them from his kingdom. His intentions were nullified by divine intervention. The King realizes his mistake and welcomes back Potana and his family to the Kingdom and provides for them to lead a respectable life.

Cast

Crew 
Director : K. V. Reddy
Dialogues and Songs: Samudrala Sr.
Producers : Moola Narayana Swamy and B.N. Reddi
Original Music : V. Nagayya
Cinematography : K. Ramnoth
Art Direction : A.K. Sekhar
Production Management : Mudigonda Lingamurthy
Assistant Director : Kamalakara Kameswara Rao
Playback Singers : Malathi, V. Nagayya, Vanaja N., Bezawada Rajarathnam and Sivaram V.

Soundtrack 
There are about 20 songs and poems in Bhakta Potana. Lyrics were written by Samudrala Sr. 
 Aataladadu Vadina Maataladadu (Singer: Nalam Vanaja)
 Baala Rasaala Saala Nava Pallava (Singer: V. Sivaram)
 Idi Manchi Samayamu Raara (Singer: Bezawada Rajaratnam)
 Evvani Chejaninchu (Potana poem)
 Immanujeswaraadhamulaki Kujambulu (Potana poem)
 Kamaneeya Bhoomi Bhaagamulu Lekunnave (Potana poem)
 Katuka Kantineeru (Potana poem) (Singer: Nagayya)
 Maa Vadina Maa Vadina Sukumari (Singers: Malathi and Nalam Vanaja)
 Mandara Makaranda Maadhuryamunadelu (Potana poem) (Singer: Nalam Vanaja)
 Mata Pita Gurudevahita (Singers: Bezawada Rajaratnam and Nagayya)
 Nammitinamma Seetamma (Singer: Hemalatha Devi)
 Nannu Vidichi Kadalakura Ramayya (Singer: Nagayya)
 Nanu Paalimpaga Chanudenchitiva (Singers: Nagayya and Nalam Vanaja)
 Paavana Guna Ramahare (Singer: Nagayya)
 Raa Poorna Chandrika (Singer: Nalam Vanaja)
 Rama Rama Seetarama (Singers: Nagayya and Nalam Vanaja)
 Sarva Dharman Parityajya (Singers: Nagaigh group)
 Sarva Mangala Naama Seetarama Rama (Singers: Nagaigh group)

References

External links 
 

1942 films
1940s Telugu-language films
Films scored by Nagayya
Films directed by K. V. Reddy
Indian black-and-white films
Indian biographical films
1940s biographical films